Harden County is one of the 141 cadastral divisions of New South Wales. It contains the town of Harden.

The origin of the name of Harden is unknown.

Parishes within this county
A full list of parishes found within this county; their current local government area (LGA) and mapping coordinates to the approximate centre of each location is as follows:

References

Counties of New South Wales